Prasit Taodee (Thai: ประสิทธิ์ เทาดี; born March 9, 1985) is a Thai football player. He plays for Thailand Division 1 League clubside BBCU F.C. as a right back position.

International career

On the back of performing extremely well in the Thailand Premier League, Prasit was called up to the full national side in coach Peter Reid's first squad announcement. He was called up with 30 other players to the 2008 AFF Suzuki Cup.

References

1985 births
Living people
Prasit Taodee
Association football fullbacks
Prasit Taodee